is a town in Kamimashiki District, Kumamoto Prefecture, Japan.

The town was formed on February 11, 2005 from the merger of the municipalities of Yabe and Seiwa with the town of Soyō from Aso District.

As of February 28, 2017, the town has an estimated population of 15,771 and a density of 29 persons per km2. The total area is 544.83 km2.

Notable people
Yasunosuke Futa - architect
Yasuhiro Yamashita - judoka
Tomiko Van - Vocalist of Do As Infinity, singer and occasional actress

References

External links

Yamato official website 

Towns in Kumamoto Prefecture